The Java War or Diponegoro War was fought in central Java from 1825 to 1830, between the colonial Dutch Empire and native Javanese rebels. The war started as a rebellion led by Prince Diponegoro, a leading member of the Javanese aristocracy who had previously cooperated with the Dutch.

The rebel forces laid siege to Yogyakarta, a move that prevented a quick victory. This gave the Dutch time to reinforce their army with colonial and European troops, allowing them to end the siege in 1825. After this defeat, the rebels continued fighting a guerrilla war for five years.

The war ended in a Dutch victory, and Prince Diponegoro was invited to a peace conference. He was betrayed and captured. Due to the cost of the war, Dutch colonial authorities implemented major reforms throughout the Dutch East Indies to ensure the colonies remained profitable.

History 
The direct cause of the Java War was the decision by the Dutch to build a road across a piece of Diponegoro's property that contained his parents' tomb. Longstanding grievances reflected tensions between the Javanese aristocracy and the increasingly powerful Dutch. Javanese aristocratic families were resentful about Dutch laws restricting their rental profits. The Dutch, meanwhile, were unwilling to lose influence over the Yogyakartan court.

Dutch influence also affected the cultural dynamics of Java. A devout Muslim, Diponegoro was alarmed by the increasingly relaxed religious observance at court. This included the rising influence of Christian Dutch colonists and the court's pro-Dutch leanings. Among Diponegoro's followers, the war was described as a jihad "both against the Dutch and the murtad or apostate Javanese."

Following a common colonial strategy, the Dutch worked to exacerbate a succession crisis for the Yogyakartan throne. Diponegoro was the eldest son of Hamengkubuwono III, but his right to succeed was disputed because his mother was not the queen. Diponegoro's rivals were his younger half-brother Hamengkubuwono IV and his then-infant nephew Hamengkubuwono V, who were supported by the Dutch.

Hostilities 
The Java War began 21 July 1825 when Prince Diponegoro raised the standard of revolt on his estate at Selarong. The rebel forces were successful in the early stages of the war, taking control of central Java and besieging Yogyakarta. The Javanese population was generally supportive of Prince Diponegoro's cause, as the Javanese peasantry had been adversely affected by the implementation of an exploitive cultivation system. The system required villages to grow export crops which got sold to the government at fixed prices. The Dutch colonial authorities were initially indecisive.

However, as the war persisted, Prince Diponegoro had difficulties retaining his army. By contrast, the Dutch colonial army was able to fill its ranks with indigenous troops from Sulawesi, and eventually received reinforcements of European troops from the Netherlands. The Dutch commander General de Kock ended the rebel siege on Yogyakarta on 25 September 1825.

Prince Diponegoro then began an extensive guerrilla war. Until 1827, the Dutch army struggled to protect the Javanese hinterland, so they bolstered their territorial defense by deploying mobile detachments of colonial troops, based in small forts throughout central Java. It is estimated that 200,000 died over the course of the conflict, including 8,000 Dutch.

The rebellion ended in 1830, after Prince Diponegoro was tricked into entering Dutch-controlled territory near Magelang, under the pretense of negotiations for a possible ceasefire. He was captured and exiled to Manado, and then to Makassar, where he died in 1855.

Aftermath 
Due to the Dutch forces' heavy losses, the colonial government decided to enlist African recruits in Gold Coast: the so-called "Belanda Hitam" ("Black Dutchmen"), to augment its East Indian and European troops.

The war was detrimental to Dutch finances; thus, the pacification of Java enabled the colonial government of the Dutch East Indies to implement Cultuurstelsel ("The Cultivation System") in Java without any local opposition in 1830. Overseen by the new governor general, Johannes van den Bosch, this cultivation system required that 20% of village land be devoted to growing cash crops for export at government rates.

Alternatively, peasants had to work in government-owned plantations for 60 days of the year. Dutch colonialists and their native allies amassed enormous wealth through this forced-export system. The profits from the colony more than repaid the Netherlands for the war, and made the Dutch East Indies self-sufficient.

References

Bibliography 
 Carey, P.B.R. Babad Dipanagara: an account of the outbreak of the Java War (1825–30): the Surakarta court version of the Babad Dipanagara Kuala Lumpur: Printed for the Council of the M.B.R.A.S. by Art Printing Works, 1981. Monograph (Royal Asiatic Society of Great Britain and Ireland. Malaysian Branch); no. 9.
 MC Ricklefs, A History of modern Indonesia since 1300, 2nd ed, 1993, pp. 116–117.
 Sagimun M. D. Pangeran Dipanegara: pahlawan nasional [Jakarta]: Proyek Biografi Pahlawan Nasional, Departemen Pendidikan dan Kebudayaan, 1976. (In Indonesian)

External links 
 

Diponegoro
Dutch conquest of Indonesia
History of Java
Military history of Indonesia
Wars involving the Netherlands